John Brock Parker (born August 15, 1981) is a professional poker player from Silver Spring, Maryland. At the 2009 World Series of Poker, he won two WSOP bracelets. First, he defeated Daniel Negreanu heads-up to win a $2,500 limit Texas hold 'em short-handed event. Just four days later, he won his second bracelet in a $2,500 no limit hold 'em short-handed event. In 2014, he won the $10,000 Omaha Hi-Low Championship to win his third career WSOP bracelet. He has 37 career cashes at the WSOP, including 10 final tables.

Like many other poker players, including David Williams and Justin Bonomo, Parker played the trading card game Magic: The Gathering before turning to poker.

As of 2014, his total live tournament winnings exceed $3,218,462. His 37 cashes at the WSOP account for $2,089,982 of those winnings.

World Series of Poker Bracelets

Notes

External links
 Brock Parker Hendon Mob profile

American poker players
World Series of Poker bracelet winners
American Magic: The Gathering players
People from Silver Spring, Maryland
Living people
1981 births